Tharut ( tharūt) is a Syrian village located in Al-Hamraa Nahiyah in Hama District, Hama. According to the Syria Central Bureau of Statistics (CBS), the village had a population of 990 in the 2004 census.

References 

Populated places in Hama District